Hiland High School is a public high school in Berlin, Ohio, United States. It is a part of East Holmes Local Schools, and the mascot is the Hawks. The school is in the heart of Amish Country, and has received multiple excellent ratings from the state since 2001.

OHSAA State Championships

 Boys Basketball – 1992, 2011, 2012  
 Girls Basketball – 2000, 2005, 2006, 2008, 2017, 2021
 Boys Baseball - 2016
 Boys Golf - 2019, 2021

Notable alumni
 Nate Torrence, comedian/actor
 Dave Schlabach, national girls high school basketball coach of the year.

External links
 District Website

Notes and references

High schools in Holmes County, Ohio
Public high schools in Ohio
Educational institutions established in 1958
1958 establishments in Ohio